Chrysoritis phosphor, the scarce scarlet or golden flash, is a butterfly of the family Lycaenidae. The species was first described by Roland Trimen in 1866. It is found in South Africa.

The wingspan is 24–28 mm for males and 26–31 mm for females. Adults are on wing year round, but mainly in November and April.

The associated ant species is unknown but is suspected to be an arboreal Crematogaster species.

Subspecies
Chrysoritis phosphor phosphor (Eastern Cape)
Chrysoritis phosphor borealis (Quickelberge, 1972) (KwaZulu-Natal midlands and Mpumalanga)

References

Butterflies described in 1866
Chrysoritis
Endemic butterflies of South Africa
Taxa named by Roland Trimen